Minami Shioya (塩谷 南美, July 27, 1997) is a Japanese water polo player. She competed in the 2020 Summer Olympics.

References

1997 births
Living people
Japanese female water polo players
Olympic water polo players of Japan
Water polo players at the 2020 Summer Olympics
Asian Games bronze medalists for Japan
Asian Games medalists in water polo
Water polo players at the 2018 Asian Games
Medalists at the 2018 Asian Games
21st-century Japanese women